Dogose may be,

Dogoše district
Dogosé language